Buderim Ginger is a brand of ginger-based food products in Australia. The Buderim Ginger Factory is a working ginger factory and tourist attraction in Pioneer Road, Yandina, Sunshine Coast Region, Queensland, Australia. 

The Buderim Ginger Factory is operated by Buderim Ginger Limited that was listed as a public company in December 1988. The company manufactures confectionery ginger products (sugar-based) that are marketed in Australia and exported to a number of international markets including UK, USA, Canada and various European countries. The company also operates a similar factory in Suva, Fiji. The ginger factory was originally located at Buderim, before moving operations to Yandina in 1978.

History 

The interruption to the supply of ginger from China, caused by World War II, provided the opportunity for growers in the Buderim area to expand their sales. As a result of this, five Buderim farmers met together in an old blacksmith's shop and formed The Buderim Ginger Grower's Co-operative Association Limited. Between them they had capital of 25 pounds, two wooden vats and 14 tons of green ginger.

In 1979, an area of nearly nine hectares was leased from the Department of Commercial & Industrial Development.  The first stage of a new factory complex was commenced, opening in time to help in processing the 1980 Early Harvest. The establishment of the Tourist and Administrative Complex in Yandina during 1985 completed the industry's relocation program and in 1989, Buderim Ginger Limited was listed on the stock exchange.

Throughout the 1990s, Buderim Ginger became globally recognised for producing the world's finest ginger. This has been achieved by investing in production facilities and meeting the needs of customers in overseas markets, from the UK to the US and from Japan to New Zealand. Buderim Ginger exports to over 17 countries.

Buderim Ginger has expanded its business, become the world's leading processor and marketer of macadamias with both Australian and Hawaiian macadamia growing and processing commencing. In 2005, Buderim Ginger also became the owner of Buderim Baking Company which produces a range of savoury pastry products that are distributed to prominent national customers in the Australian retail market. The Ginger Factory maintains its position as one of the region's most popular tourist attractions with the launch of the Taste of Ginger Tour and the opening of the Heritage Centre.

Tourism 

There are rides, tours of the factory, and shops, restaurants and other exhibits for visitors to enjoy. 

The on-site souvenir shop has a large select of Buderim Ginger products in the world, from ginger beers and cordial, marmalades and spreads, to sweets and ginger pieces.

References 

Sunshine Coast Region
Tourist attractions in Queensland